Raptadu is a Mandal in Anantapur district of the Indian state of Andhra Pradesh. It is the mandal headquarters of Raptadu mandal .

References 

Villages in Anantapur district
Mandal headquarters in Anantapur district